The 1888 Gower by-election was a parliamentary by-election held for the House of Commons constituency of Gower in South Wales in 1888.

Vacancy
The vacancy resulted from the death of the sitting member, Frank Ash Yeo, who had held the seat since it was formed in 1885.

The Result
David Randell was elected by a small majority, defeating the Conservative landowner, John  Dillwyn-Llewellyn.

References

See also
List of United Kingdom by-elections 
United Kingdom by-election records

1888 elections in the United Kingdom
1888 in Wales
1880s elections in Wales
By-elections to the Parliament of the United Kingdom in Welsh constituencies